The United States Department of Labor (DOL) is one of the executive departments of the U.S. federal government. It is responsible for the administration of federal laws governing occupational safety and health, wage and hour standards, unemployment benefits, reemployment services, and occasionally, economic statistics. It is headed by the Secretary of Labor, who reports directly to the President of the United States and is a member of the president's Cabinet.

The purpose of the Department of Labor is to foster, promote, and develop the well being of the wage earners, job seekers, and retirees of the United States; improve working conditions; advance opportunities for profitable employment; and assure work-related benefits and rights. In carrying out this mission, the Department of Labor administers and enforces more than 180 federal laws and thousands of federal regulations. These mandates and the regulations that implement them cover many workplace activities for about 10 million employers and 125 million workers. Julie Su is currently serving as acting secretary since March 11, 2023 following the resignation of Marty Walsh.

The department's headquarters is housed in the Frances Perkins Building, named in honor of Frances Perkins, the Secretary of Labor from 1933 to 1945.

History

In 1884, the U.S. Congress first established a Bureau of Labor Statistics with the Bureau of Labor Act, to collect information about labor and employment. This bureau was under the Department of the Interior. The Bureau started collecting economic data in 1884, and published their first report in 1886. Later, in 1888, the Bureau of Labor became an independent Department of Labor, but lacked executive rank.

In February 1903, it became a bureau again when the Department of Commerce and Labor was established. United States President William Howard Taft signed the March 4, 1913, bill (the last day of his presidency), establishing the Department of Labor as a Cabinet-level department. William B. Wilson was appointed as the first Secretary of Labor on March 5, 1913, by President Wilson. In October 1919, Secretary Wilson chaired the first meeting of the International Labour Organization even though the U.S. was not yet a member.

In September 1916, the Federal Employees' Compensation Act introduced benefits to workers who are injured or contract illnesses in the workplace. The act established an agency responsible for federal workers' compensation, which was transferred to the Labor Department in the 1940s and has become known as the Office of Workers' Compensation Programs.

Frances Perkins, the first female cabinet member, was appointed to be Secretary of Labor by President Roosevelt on March 4, 1933. Perkins served for 12 years, and became the longest-serving Secretary of Labor.

During the John F. Kennedy Administration, planning was undertaken to consolidate most of the department's offices, then scattered around more than 20 locations. In the mid‑1960s, construction on the "New Labor Building" began and construction was finished in 1975. In 1980, it was named in honor of Frances Perkins.

President Lyndon B. Johnson asked Congress to consider the idea of reuniting Commerce and Labor. He argued that the two departments had similar goals and that they would have more efficient channels of communication in a single department. However, Congress never acted on it.

In the 1970s, following the civil rights movement, the Labor Department under Secretary George P. Shultz made a concerted effort to promote racial diversity in unions.

In 1978, the Department of Labor created the Philip Arnow Award, intended to recognize outstanding career employees such as the eponymous Philip Arnow. In the same year, Carin Clauss became the department's first female solicitor of the department.

In 2010, a local of the American Federation of Government Employees stated their unhappiness that a longstanding flextime program reduced under the George W. Bush administration had not been restored under the Obama administration. Department officials said the program was modern and fair and that it was part of ongoing contract negotiations with the local.

In August 2010, the Partnership for Public Service ranked the Department of Labor 23rd out of 31 large agencies in its annual "Best Places to Work in the Federal Government" list.

In December 2010, then–Department of Labor Secretary Hilda Solis was named the chair of the U.S. Interagency Council on Homelessness, of which Labor has been a member since its beginnings in 1987.

In July 2011, Ray Jefferson, Assistant Secretary for VETS resigned due to his involvement in a contracting scandal.

In March 2013, the department began commemorating its centennial.

In July 2013, Tom Perez was confirmed as Secretary of Labor. According to remarks by Perez at his swearing-in ceremony, "Boiled down to its essence, the Department of Labor is the department of opportunity."

In April 2017, Alexander Acosta was confirmed as the new Secretary of Labor. In July 2019, Acosta resigned due to a scandal involving his role in the plea deal with Jeffrey Epstein. He was succeeded on September 30, 2019, by Eugene Scalia. Scalia served until the beginning of the Biden administration on January 20, 2021. Marty Walsh was confirmed as secretary on March 22, 2021. He resigned on March 11, 2023 and was succeeded by deputy secretary Julie Su who is currently serving in an acting position.

Agencies, boards, offices, programs, library and corporation of the department

 Administrative Review Board (ARB)
 Benefits Review Board (BRB)
 Bureau of International Labor Affairs (ILAB)
 Bureau of Labor Statistics (BLS)
 Center for Faith and Opportunity Initiative (CFOI)
 Employee Benefits Security Administration (EBSA)
 Employees' Compensation Appeals Board (ECAB)
 Ombudsman for the Energy Employees Occupational Illness Compensation Program (EEOMBD)
 Employment and Training Administration (ETA)
 Mine Safety and Health Administration (MSHA)
 Occupational Safety and Health Administration (OSHA)
 Office of Federal Contract Compliance Programs (OFCCP)
 Office of Inspector General (OIG)
 Office of Labor-Management Standards (OLMS)
 Office of Workers' Compensation Programs (OWCP)
 Veterans' Employment and Training Service (VETS)
 Wage and Hour Division (WHD)
 Women's Bureau (WB)
 Pension Benefit Guaranty Corporation
 PBGC Office of the Inspector General
 Office of Administrative Law Judges (OALJ)
 Office of Congressional and Intergovernmental Affairs (OCIA)
 Office of the Assistant Secretary for Administration and Management (OASAM)
 Office of the Chief Information Officer (OCIO)
 Office of the Assistant Secretary for Policy (OASP)
 Office of the Chief Financial Officer (OCFO)
 Office of Disability Employment Policy (ODEP)
 Office of Public Affairs (OPA)
 Office of Public Liaison (OPL)
 Office of Unemployment Insurance Modernization (OUIM)
 Office of the Solicitor (SOL)
 Office of the Secretary (OSEC)
Office of the Deputy Secretary

Other
 Wirtz Labor Library
 Job Corps

Relevant legislation 

 1926: Railway Labor Act
 1949: Fair Labor Standards Amendment PL 81-393
 1953: Small Business Act PL 83-163
 1954: Internal Revenue Code PL 83-591
 1955: Fair Labor Standards Amendment PL 84-381
 1958: Small Business Administration extension PL 85-536
 1961: Fair Labor Standards Amendment PL 87-30
 1961: Area Redevelopment Act PL 87-27
 1962: Manpower Development and Training Act PL 87-415
 1962: Public Welfare Amendments PL 87-543
 1963: Amendments to National Defense Education Act PL 88-210
 1964: Economic Opportunity Act PL 88-452
 1965: Vocational Rehabilitation Act amended PL 89-333
 1965: Executive Order 11246
 1965: McNamara-O'Hara Service Contract Act
 1966: Fair Labor Standards Amendment PL 89-601
 1970: Occupational Safety and Health Act
 1973: Comprehensive Employment and Training Act PL 93-203
 1973: Section 503 of the Rehabilitation Act PL 93-112
 1974: Fair Labor Standards Amendment PL 93-259
 1974: Vietnam Era Veterans' Readjustment Assistance Act PL 92-540
 1974: Employee Retirement Income Security Act of 1974 (ERISA) Pub.L. 93-406
 1975: Revenue Adjustment Act (Earned Income Tax Credit) PL 94-12, 164
 1976: Overhaul of vocational education programs PL 94-482
 1976: Social Security Act Amendments (Aid to Day Care Centers) PL 94-401
 1977: Fair Labor Standards Amendment PL 95-151
 1977: Federal Mine Safety and Health Act
 1978: Full Employment and Balanced Growth Act PL 95-523
 1981: Budget Reconciliation Act PL 97-35
 1982: Job Training Partnership Act PL 97-300
 1983: Migrant and Seasonal Agricultural Workers Protection Act PL 99-603
 1988: Family Support Act PL 100-485
 1988: Employee Polygraph Protection Act
 1989: Fair Labor Standards Amendment PL 101-157
 1990: Omnibus Budget Reconciliation Act PL 101-508
 1993: Family and Medical Leave Act PL 103-3
 1993: Omnibus Budget Reconciliation and Bankruptcy Act PL 103-66
 1996: Small Business Job Protection Act of 1996 PL 104-188
 1996: Personal Responsibility and Work Opportunity Act PL 104-193
 1996: Veterans Employment Opportunities Act PL 105-339
 1998: Workforce Investment Act of 1998
 2014: Workforce Innovation and Opportunity Act

See also 

 Ministry of Labour links to articles on national ministries or departments worldwide, and US states
 Equal Employment Opportunity Commission
 National Labor Relations Board
 Occupational Information Network (Holland Codes)
 Ticket to Work
 Title 20 of the Code of Federal Regulations, on Employee's benefits

Notes and references

Bibliography

 Goldberg, Joseph P., and William T. Moye. The first hundred years of the Bureau of Labor Statistics (US Department of Labor, 1985) online

 Laughlin, Kathleen A. Women's work and public policy: A history of the Women's Bureau, US Department of Labor, 1945-1970 (Northeastern UP, 2000). online
 Boris, Eileen. "Women's Work and Public Policy: a History of the Women's Bureau, US Department of Labor, 1945-1970." NWSA Journal 14#1 (2002), pp. 201-207 online

 

 Ritchie, Melinda N. "Back-channel representation: a study of the strategic communication of senators with the us Department of Labor." Journal of Politics 80.1 (2018): 240-253.

External links 

 
 Department of Labor on USAspending.gov
 U.S. Department of Labor in the Federal Register
 Department of Labor reports and recommendations from the Government Accountability Office

 
1913 establishments in Washington, D.C.
Government agencies established in 1913
Labor